Nim's Island is a 2008 adventure film written and directed by Jennifer Flackett and Mark Levin, and based on the children's story of the same name by Wendy Orr. A young girl alone on a remote island seeks help from an agoraphobic San Franciscan author. While the author attempts to overcome her agoraphobia to search for her, Nim tries to overcome her fear of losing her father. It stars Abigail Breslin, Jodie Foster, and Gerard Butler, and was released on 4 April 2008 by 20th Century Fox. The film received mixed reviews from critics and earned $100.1 million on a $37 million budget.

Plot
11-year-old Nim (Abigail Breslin) lives with her widower marine biologist father Jack Rusoe (Gerard Butler) on a South Pacific island. Jack has told Nim that her mother Emily died when she was swallowed by a blue whale after it was scared by a ship called The Buccaneer. Nim has several native animals for company: Selkie the sea lion, Fred the bearded dragon, Chica the sea turtle, and Galileo the pelican.

Jack takes the boat for a two-day scientific mission to find Protozoa nim, a new species of plankton he has named after her. He wants to take Nim along but she convinces him she can manage on her own and must stay to oversee the imminent hatching of Chica's eggs. They will be able to communicate by satellite phone.

Nim is fond of "Alex Rover" adventure books written by Alexandra Rover (Jodie Foster). Nim receives an email addressed to her father from "Alex Rover" enquiring about Jack's field of knowledge. She imagines it is from the explorer but is actually from the author. The author, in turn, is a neurotic agoraphobe who imagines she is speaking to her fictional hero Alex Rover (also portrayed by Butler). An email conversation follows.

Jack’s sailboat has a problem in a cyclone and cannot return on the planned day, nor communicate with Nim. Galileo brings Jack things he needs to fix his ship as sharks begin to circle. Nim tells Alex her father has not returned as planned but she feels powerless to help, given that she can hardly even open her own door.

The island is visited by uncouth tourists who Nim believes to be pirates, as the name of their cruise liner is The Buccaneer. She attempts to make the island unattractive to them by catapulting lizards to shore, and by making a fire in the crater of the volcano and rolling boulders down the slopes to make it appear to be erupting. In so doing she inadvertently triggers an actual eruption. The tourists scramble for the boats. One of them, a boy, Edmund, sees and catches up with Nim. He is confused by her presence and she tells him she lives on the island. He tells the others, but no one believes him.

Meanwhile, Alexandra's visions of her character Alex Rover help her to overcome her agoraphobia in order to travel to the island to rescue Nim. Nim, expecting "Alex" (the fictional male character), at first rejects Alexandra, but later relents and they share a meal.

The next day, Nim starts to cry, reasoning that if her ever-successful father were still alive he would be back already. Luckily, Jack reaches the island windsurfing on a makeshift catamaran. Jack and Alex meet and begin to get to know each other (Alex amazed at Jack being just as she imagined her fictional character). The film ends with everyone playing on the beach, using a coconut as a ball.

Cast
 Abigail Breslin as Nim Rusoe
 Jodie Foster as Alexandra "Alex" Rover
 Gerard Butler as Jack Rusoe / Alex Rover
 Anthony Simcoe as First Mate
 Alphonso McAuley as Russell
 Morgan Griffin as Alice
 Michael Carman as Captain
 Christopher Baker as Ensign
 Maddison Joyce as Edmund
 Peter Callan as Edmund's Father

Production
Shooting took place on Hinchinbrook Island, off the northeast coast of Queensland, Australia over three weeks and ended in October 2007.

Reception
The review aggregator Rotten Tomatoes reports that 51% of 104 surveyed critics gave the film a positive review; the average rating is 5.7/10. The site's consensus reads: "Despite good intentions, Nim's Island flounders under an implausible storyline, simplistic stock characters, and distracting product placement." Metacritic reported the film had an average score of 55 out of 100 based on 24 reviews. In its opening weekend, Nim's Island grossed $13.3 million in 3,513 theaters in the United States and Canada, ranking #2 at the box office behind 21. The film had a US box office gross of $48 million and a foreign gross of $52 million, for a total gross of $100 million worldwide. The film was nominated by the Visual Effects Society Awards in the category of Outstanding Supporting Visual Effects in a Feature Motion Picture.

Home media release
Nim's Island was released on DVD on 5 August 2008. It opened at #1 at the DVD sales chart, selling 466,326 DVD units and earning $8.4 million. As per the latest figures, 1,013,100 DVD units have been sold, grossing $21.4 million in the US.

Soundtrack
The score to Nim's Island was composed by award-winning composer Patrick Doyle. He recorded his score with the Hollywood Studio Symphony at the Sony Scoring Stage during the week of 3 February 2008. This marked the first time in a decade that he recorded a score in Los Angeles.

The song playing over the closing credits is "Beautiful Day" by U2.

The film's soundtrack CD was released on 8 April 2008 from Varèse Sarabande.

Sequel
A sequel, Return to Nim's Island, was released theatrically in Australia on 4 April 2013 in 77 screens with an opening weekend box office take of AUS$176,848. It aired on the Hallmark Channel on 15 March in the U.S. and was released on DVD 19 March 2013, exclusively to Wal-Mart, and two days later on 21 March worldwide. Box Office Mojo reports AUS$1.1 million in revenues overall.

Bindi Irwin replaced Abigail Breslin as Nim Rusoe, Toby Wallace replaced Maddison Joyce as Edmund, and Matthew Lillard replaced Gerard Butler as Jack Rusoe, Nim's father.

References

External links

 
 
 
 
 
 Nim's Island – Full production notes for Nim's Island

2008 films
2000s children's films
2000s fantasy adventure films
20th Century Fox films
American children's films
American children's adventure films
Australian children's adventure films
Australian fantasy adventure films
2000s English-language films
Agoraphobia in fiction
Australia in fiction
Fictional islands
Films based on children's books
Films scored by Patrick Doyle
Films set in San Francisco
Films set in Oceania
Films set on fictional islands
Films shot at Village Roadshow Studios
Films about mental health
Films about writers
Films about children
Films about lizards
Summit Entertainment films
Universal Pictures films
Walden Media films
2000s American films